Xalqlar Doʻstligi is a station of the Tashkent Metro on Chilonzor Line. The station was opened on 6 November 1977 as part of the inaugural section of Tashkent Metro, between October inkilobi and Sabir Rakhimov. The station is column type with underground and ground-based lobby.

History  
From the opening, the station was called Friendship of Peoples. On 6 August 2008, the Xalqalr Doʻstligi metro station was renamed into Bunyodkor. On 26 April 2018, at a video conference, the President of Uzbekistan Shavkat Mirziyoyev proposed to return the previous name. The Tashkent City Kengash of People's Deputies at the 36th session on 3 May 2018 approved the return of the name "Xalqalr Doʻstligi" to the Bunyodkor metro station.

References

Tashkent Metro stations
Railway stations opened in 1977
1977 establishments in Uzbekistan